Carlos Eduardo Soares or simply Ataliba (born 2 March 1979), is a Brazilian midfielder. He currently plays for Marília Atlético Clube.

Ataliba previously played for Coritiba, Atlético Mineiro and Botafogo.

Club statistics

References

External links

1979 births
Living people
Brazilian footballers
Brazilian expatriate footballers
Expatriate footballers in Japan
Associação Atlética Ponte Preta players
Coritiba Foot Ball Club players
Sport Club do Recife players
Clube Atlético Mineiro players
Botafogo de Futebol e Regatas players
Clube de Regatas Brasil players
Marília Atlético Clube players
Vila Nova Futebol Clube players
J1 League players
Vissel Kobe players
Kyoto Sanga FC players
Shahrdari Tabriz players
Expatriate footballers in Iran
Paulínia Futebol Clube players
Campeonato Brasileiro Série A players
Campeonato Brasileiro Série B players
Association football midfielders